Fame and Fortune is the seventh studio album by Bad Company, released in 1986. It was the first album released by the reformed group, featuring original members Mick Ralphs (guitar) and Simon Kirke (drums), with the addition of new frontman Brian Howe (formerly of Ted Nugent's band) substituting for original singer Paul Rodgers. While original bassist Boz Burrell appears credited as part of the line-up, the liner notes reveal that session player Steve Price played on the album.

The album peaked at No. 106 on the Billboard 200.

Production
The album was produced by Foreigner producer Keith Olsen. Foreigner's Mick Jones served as executive producer and co-writer of two tracks.

Critical reception
The Morning Call deemed the album a "high-tech clunker."

Track listing

Personnel
Bad Company
 Brian Howe – vocals, saxophone
 Mick Ralphs – guitar, keyboards
 Steven Price – bass (Boz Burrell is credited but does not appear)
 Simon Kirke – drums
with:
 Gregg Dechert – keyboards, guitar

Production 
Executive Producer  – Mick Jones
Engineered by – Stuart Epps, Brian Foraker, Jay Healy
Mixed by – Frank Filipetti with Mick Jones
Recorded at The Sol, Berkshire
Mixed at Goodnight L. A. and The Hit Factory New York
Mastered at Sterling Sound New York by Ted Jensen
Sid Pryce –  band technician
Produced by Keith Olsen

References

1986 albums
Bad Company albums
Albums produced by Mick Jones (Foreigner)
Albums produced by Keith Olsen